Daniel Patricio Muñoz Bravo (born 11 February 1966) is a Chilean actor, comedian, and cueca singer.

His extensive curriculum has enshrined him as one of the most important actors in his country. He is famous both for his comic characters in television as El Efe, El Malo, El Chanta, El Sha and El Carmelo, and also for more dramatic roles in film and television; highlighting his starring role as Juan Herrera in the acclaimed Los 80  of Channel 13, as the private detective Donovan Huaiquimán in Huaiquimán and Tolosa, as Juan "Lennon" in the film The Sentimental Teaser, as Chavelo in the film A Cab for Three and as Salvador Allende in Allende en su laberinto.

Early and personal life 
He was born in San Fernando and studied at the theater school of the University of Chile, graduating in 1988 with the play "El alma buena de Se Chuan". He lived his childhood with his grandmother, aunt, mother and sister. His parents would divorce when he was 11. His musical roots begin in childhood after his grandmother inserted him into the world of cueca and folklore.

He married Enoe Carolina Coulon for the first time in the late 1980s, who he would have his first daughter with: Lilamaria. On a trip to Berlin with the Green Hat Theater company, he met Heidrun Breier, whom he had a son with in 1998: Gabriel.

Acting career 

In 1987, he auditioned for the program Sábados Gigantes where they were looking for a young actor to play a humorous character. It is at that moment when his first character recognized and acclaimed by the public is born; El Efe is a young man who appears to be more popular and useful than he really is. Such was the success and fame of the character that people recognized him in the streets and he even starred in an advertising campaign and a commercial for television characterized as this character, which generated a situation of discomfort in the actor that triggered him to leave television to dedicate to theater.

In 1992 he joins the new cast of Jappening with Ja in Megavisión. Where he gave life to the son of Willy Zañartu and Señora Pochi, Willy Zañartu Jr. or "Willito", a pizza maker who could never make the delivery since he appeared in different places week after week, and "Ivan Zamorano" in the parody of a very popular wine commercial at the time. There he was until the end of the 1993 season.

In 1997 he appears in the humorous program Na' que ver con Chile where another of his most famous performances is born: El Malo, a young marginal. It was a regular show in Venga conmigo conducted by José Alfredo Fuentes, and prime Canal 13 show Viva el lunes. The popularity of the character caused him to be recruited for the Viña del Mar International Song Festival in the year 2000 where the character was presented for the last time. That is until 2010 when he appeared in a government commercial that warns about taking care of passwords and confidential information of bank users in the face of massive information theft.

A year later he would create Carmelo where he rescued his country roots. It is next to Carmelo where he begins his direct approach with the cueca. Carmelo managed to become a popular phenomenon for which he is once again invited to the Quinta Vergara.

Already recognized  as a major comedian, his acting consolidation as a serious actor would come in Los 80 in 2008 from the hand of the character of Juan Herrera, a middle-class father who has to support his three children and wife during the military dictatorship in the 1980s in Chile. Thanks to this character has won two Altazor awards for best actor, in turn has consolidated the series turning it into a cult object for the public.

As a film actor he was chosen as the best actor at the Iberoamerican Film Festival of Bolivia (2002) and winner of an APES award for his role in the film A Cab for Three. He also participated in the films Historias de Fútbol and El Chacotero Sentimental, achieving international success and (added to his performance in El Desquite) an Altazor Award for best film actor of 2000. In 2007 he acted in Radio Corazón, the sequel of El Chacotero Sentimental which eared him a new Altazor nomination.

In 2015 he starred as Salvador Allende in the film Allende en su laberinto, directed by Miguel Littin.

Music career 

He has also ventured into the musical field, as a cueca brava singer, being a vocalist for the group 3x7 Veintiuna.

In the 2002 Cuecazo del Roto Chileno he met Félix Llancafil, voice of Los Chacareros de Paine. Muñoz's work on records by Los Chileneros, Los Tricolores and Héctor Pavez served as artistic support to unite him with Llancafil, who has been in charge of vocals and accordion in 3 x 7 Veintiuna, since 2005. The group promotes a type of elegant urban, and socially aware cueca. In 2005 they released their first album called Cuecas como las canta el roto which incorporates compositions by people like Fernando González Marabolí and Nano Nuñez and included three of the cuecas written by Pablo Neruda in tribute to Manuel Rodríguez.

In 2007 they are invited to the Festival del Huaso de Olmué. The same year they released their second album called La Otra Patita.

Finally his third studio work, Al compás del 6 x 8, would be the consolidation of the group in the national music scene. Critical acclaim would lead it to win an Altazor award in 2010 for "best album of traditional or root folk music". In 2012 he returns to the Quinta Vergara, on the third day of the Viña del Mar Festival, now as a singer.

In 2013 he released an album with his new band called Los Marujos, entitled Cueca, and in 2015 another one called Tirando Patá.

In 2020 he released a new album with another band called Los 30 pesos, entitled Crónicas de una revuelta in clear reference to Estallido social.

Filmography

Films

Telenovelas

TV Series 

{| class="wikitable sortable"
|-
! Year
! Show
! Role
! Channel
! class="unsortable"|Notes
|-
| 2002
| Is Harry on the Boat?
| Tony
| Sky 1
| Episode #6
|-
| rowspan="3"|2003, 2004, 2006
| rowspan="3"|La vida es una lotería
| Ricardo Cuevas
| rowspan="3"|TVN
| Episodio: "Ricardo Cuevas, el único ganador"
|-
| Ramón
| Episode: "Ramón de Patronato"
|-
| Patricio
| Episode: "El cariño del padre"
|-
| 2005
| El cuento del tío
| Lalo
| TVN
| Episode: "El arriendo"
|-
| 2005
| Los Simuladores
| Jorge
| Canal 13
| 2 episodes
|-
| 2005
| La Nany
| Carlos
| Mega
| Episode: "La tortuga"
|-
| rowspan="2"|2005,2006
| rowspan="2"|Tiempo Final
| Franco
| rowspan="2"|TVN
| Episode: "El anzuelo"
|-
| Julio
| Episode: "Cita online"
|-
| 2006
| La otra cara del espejo
|  Joaquín
| TVN
| Episode: "La trampa/La última broma"
|-
| 2006
| JPT: Justicia Para Todos
| Retamal
| TVN
| Episode: "Cancha mortal"
|-
| 2006,2008
| Huaiquimán y Tolosa
| Donovan Huaiquiman
| Canal 13
| 24 episodes Altazor Award al Mejor actor de televisión (2007)
|-
| 2007
| Héroes
| José de San Martín
| Canal 13
| 2 episodes
|-
| 2008–2014
| Los 80
| Juan Herrera
| Canal 13
| 72 episodes Altazor Award Best TV actor (2009–2010)  Nominadee—Altazor Award al Mejor actor de televisión (2011–2012)  Nominadee—TV Grama Awards al Mejor actor (2009–2012) Nominadee—Copihue de Oro al Mejor actor (2011–2012)
|-
|2012
| Vida por vida
| Dr. Samuel Vásquez
| Canal 13
| 13 episodes
|-
|2015
| Príncipes de barrio
| Manuel Rojas
| Canal 13
| Premio Caleuche al Mejor actor protagónico en series y/o miniseries (2016) 
|-
|2015
| Zamudio
| Iván Zamudio
|TVN
| 4 episodes
|-
|2015
| Juana Brava
| Charles
|TVN
|
|-
|2016
|Por Fin Solos
| Roberto Aguilera
|TVN
|24 episodes
|-
|2017
|Ramona
|Héctor Carter
|TVN
|
|-
|2018
|Santiago Paranormal
|
|TVN
|1 episode
|-
|2018
|Casa de Angelis
|Farid Chadud
|TVN
|
|-
|2019
|La vida simplemente
|Don Antonio
|La Red
|
|-
|2019
|Berko: El arte de callar
|
|Fox
|
|-
|2020
|La Jauría
|Ibarra
|Amazon
|
|-
|2022
|42 Days of Darkness
|Arturo Fernandez
|Netflix
|}

 Discography 
 With 3x7 Veintiuna 
 2006 - Cuecas como las canta el roto 2007 - La otra patita 2009 - Al compás del 6 x 8 2010 - En vivo... pa' los vivos 2011 - Viejos lindos... pero cuando eran guaguas With Los Marujos 
 2013 - Cueca 2015 - Tirando Patá With Los 30 Pesos 
 2020 - Crónicas de una revuelta''

References

External links 

1966 births
Living people
Chilean male film actors
Chilean male television actors
Chilean male comedians